Amon may refer to:

Mythology 
 Amun, an Ancient Egyptian deity, also known as Amon and Amon-Ra
 Aamon, a Goetic demon

People

Mononym
 Amon of Judah ( 664– 640 BC), king of Judah
 Amon of Toul ( 375– 423 AD), second recorded Bishop of Toul

Given name 
 Amon Olive Assemon (born 1987), Ivorian handball player
 Amon Bazira (1944–1993), Pan-Africanist leader and organizer
 Amon Buchanan (born 1982), Australian rules football player
 Amon G. Carter (1879–1955), American publisher and art collector
 Amon Göth (1908–1946), Austrian concentration camp commandant in the Nazi SS during World War II
 Amon Gordon (born 1981), American football player
 Amon B. King (1807–1836), American military leader
 Amon Kotei (1915–2011), Ghanaian sculptor and artist
 Amon Kotey, Ghanaian boxer
 Amon Liner (1940–1976), American poet and playwright
 Amon Miyamoto (born 1958), Japanese director
 Amon Murwira, Zimbabwean politician
 Amon N'Douffou V, King of Sanwi in Ivory Coast
 Amon Neequaye (born 1963), Ghanaian boxer
 Amon Nikoi (1930–2002), Ghanaian economist and diplomat
 Amon Saba Saakana (formerly Sebastian Clarke), British-Trinidadian writer, broadcaster and publisher
 Amon Simutowe (born 1982), Zambian chess player 
 Amon-Ra St. Brown (born 1999), American football wide receiver
 Amon Tobin (born 1972), Brazilian IDM producer
 Amon Ritter von Gregurich (1867–1915), Hungarian fencer
 Amon Wilds (1762–1833), English architect and builder
 Amon Henry Wilds (1784 or 1790–1857), English architect
 Monsieur Amon (1849–1915), French coffee and real estate entrepreneur

Surname 
 Alexandra Amon (born 1981), French-Ivorian actress and film producer
 Angelika Amon (1967–2020), Austrian-American molecular biologist
 Artur Amon (1916–1944), Estonian basketball player 
 Carol Amon (born 1946), American judge
 Chris Amon (1943–2016), New Zealand motor racing driver 
 Cristiano Amon (born 1970), Brazilian-American manager
 Cristina Amon, Uruguayan-born American scientist and academic
 Diva Amon, Trinidadian marine biologist
 Franz Amon, a violinist
 Ines Amon (born 1992), Slovenian handball player
 Johann Andreas Amon (1763–1825), German composer
 Jonathan Amon (born 1999), American soccer player
 Joseph Amon (born 1969), American epidemiologist and human rights activist 
 Karl Amon (born 1995), Australian rules football player
 Morissette (singer) (born 1996), Filipina singer-songwriter
 Nissim Amon (born 1963), Israeli meditation teacher

Arts, entertainment, and media

Music
 Amon, original name of the band Deicide
 Amon, the house in the storyline of the King Diamond album Them
 Amon Amarth, Swedish melodic death metal band
 Amon Düül II, German rock band
 Amon: Feasting the Beast, compilation album by the band Deicide

Television and film
 Amon Saga, a 1986 anime film
 Hanna Amon, a 1951 German film

Fictional characters and places 

 Amon (Dungeons & Dragons)
 Amon (The Legend of Korra)
 Amon (StarCraft)
 Amon (Witch Hunter Robin), in the Witch Hunter Robin anime
 Amon, a character in the anime Amon Saga 
 Amon, in Armour of God II: Operation Condor
 Amon, in Devilman and Devilman Crybaby
 Amon, a non-playable character in the Lufia videogames; see 
 Amon, in the manga and anime series Magi: The Labyrinth of Magic
 Amon, in the game series Megami Tensei; see Shin Megami Tensei If...
 Amon, in the game Shadow Hearts: Covenant
 Amon Ad Raza, in Warmachine
 Amon Amarth, another name for Mount Doom which means "Mountain of Fate" 
 Amon County, Ohio, the location of a cult in Netflix Series Devil in Ohio. 
 Amon Garam, the Japanese name of Adrian Gecko, in the anime series Yu-Gi-Oh! GX
 Amon Koutarou, a character in the Tokyo Ghoul manga series
 Amon Sur, an alien supervillain from DC Universe. 
 Amon Tomaz, an alternate name of Osiris, in the DC Comics universe

Other uses 
 Amon (Formula One team), also known as Chris Amon Racing
 Amon Creek, a river in Washington, USA 
 Amon: The Darkside of the Devilman, a horror manga

See also 
 
 Aman (disambiguation)
 Amun (disambiguation)
 Amman (disambiguation)
 Ammann (disambiguation)
 Ammon (disambiguation)